Donyell Lamar Marshall (born May 18, 1973) is an American basketball coach and former professional player. He is currently an assistant coach for the Greensboro Swarm of the NBA G League. During his National Basketball Association (NBA) career, he played with eight different teams.

Early career
Marshall was born on May 18, 1973, in Reading, Pennsylvania. He graduated from Reading High School.

He attended the University of Connecticut and was a player in the university's basketball program. Marshall was a unanimous pick as Big East Player of the Year in 1993–94.

Professional career
Marshall left college early to participate in the 1994 NBA draft. He was selected after his junior year at the University of Connecticut by the Minnesota Timberwolves, as the fourth overall pick. He was traded 40 games into his rookie season to the Golden State Warriors in exchange for power forward Tom Gugliotta on February 18, 1995.

Marshall played with the Warriors until 2000, when he was traded to the Utah Jazz as part of a four-team deal. He played alongside future Hall of Fame nominees Karl Malone and John Stockton as a role player with the Jazz.

Marshall signed as a free agent with the Chicago Bulls on August 16, 2002, where he played with Jalen Rose, Kendall Gill, Jay Williams, Eddy Curry and Tyson Chandler.

On December 1, 2003, Marshall was traded to the Toronto Raptors along with Rose and Lonny Baxter for Antonio Davis, Jerome Williams and Chris Jefferies. In a March 13, 2005, game against the Philadelphia 76ers, he tied Kobe Bryant's NBA record for three-point field goals made in one game, by making 12 of 19 attempts.

In June 2005, Marshall signed a four-year contract with the Cleveland Cavaliers, who were trying to build a veteran core around LeBron James. In May 2007, he helped the team to a victory over the New Jersey Nets in Game 6 of the Eastern Conference semifinals by making six three-pointers. The victory propelled the Cavaliers to the NBA Eastern Conference Finals against the Detroit Pistons, and eventually the NBA Finals against the San Antonio Spurs.

On February 21, 2008, Marshall was traded to the Seattle SuperSonics in an 11-player deal that involved three organizations. After the SuperSonics moved to Oklahoma City, the team waived him before the start of the new season.

On September 1, 2008, Marshall agreed to terms with the Philadelphia 76ers on a one-year contract. The move signaled Marshall's impending retirement, as he said his goal was to play for his hometown 76ers before he retired. Playing just 25 games, he provided Philadelphia with veteran leadership and three point shooting. He played a key role in Philadelphia's game 1 victory over the Orlando Magic in the first round of the playoffs; he scored 11 points and made a three-pointer to tie the game in the final minute.

Coaching career
On October 26, 2009, after retiring from the NBA, Marshall joined Comcast SportsNet as a 76ers' post-game live analyst. Marshall left broadcasting on July 1, 2010 to become an assistant men's basketball coach of the George Washington Colonials under fellow Univ. of Connecticut alumnus Karl Hobbs.

On November 3, 2011, Marshall was announced as an assistant coach of the D-League's Maine Red Claws.

In September 2013, Marshall became an assistant coach of the Rider University men's basketball team. Marshall was largely responsible for the effective play of senior transfer center Matt Lopez and a second place regular season finish in the MAAC in 2014–15.

Following a 21–12 season at Rider which earned a College Basketball Invitational appearance, Marshall was named as an assistant on Nate Oats's staff at the University at Buffalo on April 16, 2015.

Central Connecticut
On April 6, 2016, he was named head men's basketball coach at Central Connecticut State. Marshall won his first game as head coach of Central Connecticut on November 11, 2016 a 75-60 win over Hartford. After the 2021 season, Marshall and Central Connecticut mutually agreed to part ways ending Marshall's time at the school after five seasons.

Greensboro Swarm
On October 24, 2021, Marshall became an assistant coach for the Greensboro Swarm of the NBA G League.

Rankings and milestones
On February 5, 2007, Marshall's number was honored at Gampel Pavilion on the University of Connecticut campus in Storrs, during halftime of the men's basketball game against the Syracuse Orangemen, as part of the Huskies of Honor ceremony which recognized personal accomplishments of 13 former players and three coaches.

Until November 7, 2016, he held and shared the NBA record (with Kobe Bryant and Stephen Curry) for most three-point field goals made in a game after he made 12 three-point field goals of 19 attempts against the Philadelphia 76ers on March 13, 2005.

Personal
Marshall's great uncle is Hall of Fame American football player Lenny Moore.

NBA career statistics

Regular season

|-
| align="left" | 
| align="left" | Minnesota
| 40 || 8 || 25.9 || .374 || .302 || .680 || 4.9 || 1.4 || .6 || 1.3 || 10.8
|-
| align="left" | 
| align="left" | Golden State
| 32 || 23 || 32.8 || .413 || .270 || .640 || 6.5 || 1.5 || .6 || 1.2 || 14.8
|-
| align="left" | 
| align="left" | Golden State
| 62 || 6 || 15.1 || .398 || .298 || .771 || 3.4 || .8 || .4 || .5 || 5.5
|-
| align="left" | 
| align="left" | Golden State
| 61 || 20 || 16.8 || .413 || .315 || .622 || 4.5 || .9 || .4 || .8 || 7.3
|-
| align="left" | 
| align="left" | Golden State
| 73 || 73 || 35.8 || .414 || .313 || .731 || 8.6 || 2.2 || 1.3 || 1.0 || 15.4
|-
| align="left" | 
| align="left" | Golden State
| 48 || 20 || 26.0 || .421 || .361 || .727 || 7.1 || 1.4 || 1.0 || .8 || 11.0
|-
| align="left" | 
| align="left" | Golden State
| 64 || 51 || 32.4 || .394 || .355 || .780 || 10.0 || 2.6 || 1.1 || 1.1 || 14.2
|-
| align="left" | 
| align="left" | Utah
| 81 || 49 || 28.7 || .503 || .320 || .751 || 7.0 || 1.6 || 1.0 || 1.0 || 13.6
|-
| align="left" | 
| align="left" | Utah
| 58 || 42 || 30.2 || .519 || .310 || .708 || 7.6 || 1.7 || .9 || 1.2 || 14.8
|-
| align="left" | 
| align="left" | Chicago
| 78 || 53 || 30.5 || .459 || .379 || .756 || 9.0 || 1.8 || 1.2 || 1.1 || 13.4
|-
| align="left" | 
| align="left" | Chicago
| 16 || 8 || 25.5 || .419 || .407 || .700 || 6.2 || 1.8 || .8 || 1.3 || 8.7
|-
| align="left" | 
| align="left" | Toronto
| 66 || 66 || 39.1 || .467 || .403 || .741 || 10.7 || 1.4 || 1.2 || 1.6 || 16.2
|-
| align="left" | 
| align="left" | Toronto
| 65 || 2 || 25.3 || .443 || .416 || .791 || 6.6 || 1.2 || .9 || .7 || 11.5
|-
| align="left" | 
| align="left" | Cleveland
| 81 || 0 || 25.6 || .395 || .324 || .748 || 6.1 || .7 || .7 || .5 || 9.3
|-
| align="left" | 
| align="left" | Cleveland
| 81 || 0 || 16.8 || .424 || .351 || .663 || 4.0 || .6 || .5 || .5 || 7.0
|-
| align="left" | 
| align="left" | Cleveland
| 11 || 1 || 14.2 || .295 || .348 || .778 || 2.7 || .5 || .2 || .8 || 3.7
|-
| align="left" | 
| align="left" | Seattle
| 15 || 0 || 12.3 || .352 || .233 || .923 || 3.1 || .3 || .3 || .5 || 3.8
|-
| align="left" | 
| align="left" | Philadelphia
| 25 || 0 || 7.6 || .452 || .455 || .500 || 1.6 || .6 || .2 || .2 || 3.8
|- class="sortbottom"
| style="text-align:center;" colspan="2"| Career
| 957 || 422 || 26.2 || .435 || .350 || .731 || 6.7 || 1.4 || .8 || .9 || 11.2

Playoffs

|-
| align="left" | 2001
| align="left" | Utah
| 5 || 5 || 32.0 || .407 || .125 || .778 || 7.6 || 1.6 || .4 || 1.0 || 10.4
|-
| align="left" | 2002
| align="left" | Utah
| 4 || 0 || 31.0 || .420 || .500 || .750 || 7.8 || 2.8 || .8 || 1.5 || 14.3
|-
| align="left" | 2006
| align="left" | Cleveland
| 13 || 0 || 26.5 || .433 || .391 || .882 || 5.6 || .6 || .5 || .7 || 9.5
|-
| align="left" | 2007
| align="left" | Cleveland
| 19 || 0 || 10.7 || .333 || .311 || .636 || 2.2 || .3 || .2 || .2 || 3.5
|-
| align="left" | 2009
| align="left" | Philadelphia
| 6 || 0 || 8.3 || .375 || .364 || .000 || 1.2 || .0 || .2 || .2 || 2.7
|- class="sortbottom"
| style="text-align:center;" colspan="2"| Career
| 47 || 5 || 18.8 || .399 || .345 || .774 || 4.0 || .7 || .3 || .5 || 6.7

Head coaching record

References

External links
 Official biography, Central Connecticut Blue Devils
 NBA Profile
 Stats at Basketball-Reference

1973 births
Living people
African-American basketball coaches
African-American basketball players
All-American college men's basketball players
American expatriate basketball people in Canada
American men's basketball coaches
American men's basketball players
Basketball coaches from Pennsylvania
Basketball players from Pennsylvania
Buffalo Bulls men's basketball coaches
Central Connecticut Blue Devils men's basketball coaches
Chicago Bulls players
Cleveland Cavaliers players
George Washington Colonials men's basketball coaches
Golden State Warriors players
Maine Red Claws coaches
McDonald's High School All-Americans
Minnesota Timberwolves draft picks
Minnesota Timberwolves players
Parade High School All-Americans (boys' basketball)
Philadelphia 76ers players
Power forwards (basketball)
Rider Broncs men's basketball coaches
Seattle SuperSonics players
Sportspeople from Reading, Pennsylvania
Toronto Raptors players
UConn Huskies men's basketball players
Utah Jazz players